Dark House is a 2014 American horror film directed by Victor Salva and starring Tobin Bell, Lesley-Anne Down and Luke Kleintank. The film follows a man named Nick Di Santo, who discovers that not only is his long-lost father alive, but that he may be able to explain the source of his clairvoyant abilities.

Plot

The film tells the story of Nick Di Santo (Kleintack), who is tormented by his ability to touch someone and see exactly how they will die. On his 23rd birthday, Nick is summoned by his mother Lillian (Down) to the asylum where she has been institutionalized since his childhood. Hoping that her request to see him is a sign of improvement, Nick is stunned by her revelation that the father he thought was long dead is really alive, and that he may know the origin of Nick's terrible gift. Nick sets out to find his father Seth with his best friend Ryan (Anthony Rey Perez) and girlfriend Eve (Alex McKenna). Every road they take on the journey leads them back to the same abandoned mansion—a house that only existed in Nick's childhood imagination, or so he thought. Finally succumbing to the will of the house, Nick becomes embroiled in a battle with a dark figure (Bell).

Cast
Luke Kleintank as	Nick Di Santo
Alex McKenna as Eve
Anthony Rey Perez as Ryan
Zack Ward as Chris McCulluch
Lacey Anzelc as Lillith
Ethan S. Smith as Sam
Lesley-Anne Down as Lilian Di Santo
Tobin Bell as Seth
Charles Agron as Lucky
Daniel Ross Owens as Brian Maker
Max Gail as Scott	
Patricia Belcher as Lee Knox
Tony Sanford as Ben
Cameron Spann as Robin

Reception 
Critical reception for Dark House has been predominantly negative and the film holds a rating of 9% on review aggregate Rotten Tomatoes, with an average rating of 2.8/10, based on 11 reviews. The New York Times and The Hollywood Reporter both panned the film, with the latter stating that "The generic title is not even the most unimaginative element of this overstuffed, cliche-ridden horror film." Nerdist News also criticized the film, as they felt that it contained too many elements that "merely clutters up a film that might find more power in being simple." As is common with Salva's films, some critics, such as John Squires of Bloody Disgusting, refused to review the film based on the director's criminal convictions for child molestation and child pornography.

References

External links
 
  
 

2014 films
2014 horror thriller films
2010s supernatural films
American horror thriller films
American haunted house films
American supernatural horror films
Films about dysfunctional families
Films directed by Victor Salva
Films shot in Mississippi
2010s supernatural horror films
2010s English-language films
2010s American films